Větrušice is a municipality and village in Prague-East District in the Central Bohemian Region of the Czech Republic. It has about 700 inhabitants.

Geography
Along the Vltava there is the Větrušická rokle National Nature Reserve. It is a large complex of steep rocks, rocky ridges, gorges and wooded slopes, where there are diverse communities of dry grasslands and rocky steppes.

References

Villages in Prague-East District